The Neon Woman is a comic play written by Tom Eyen.  

The play is an outrageous murder mystery set in a seedy Baltimore burlesque house run by a retired stripper. It was written as a vehicle for Pink Flamingos star Divine, who had previously starred in a revival of Eyen's Women Behind Bars. The cast also featured Holly Woodlawn, Helen Hanft, Brenda Bergman, William Duff-Griffin, Maria Duval, Sweet William Edgar, Lee Corbet, Debra Greenfield, Hope Stansbury, and George Patterson, and was directed by longtime Eyen collaborator Ron Link. 

The play was produced at Hurrah, a dance club on Manhattan's Upper West Side. The Neon Woman opened on April 16, 1978, and had 84 performances, closing on July 15, 1978.

References

Comedy plays
American plays
1978 plays